Crahan Denton (pronunciation: "kran"; born Arthur Crahan Denton; March 20, 1914 – December 4, 1966) was an American stage, film and television actor. One of his most famous film roles was in To Kill a Mockingbird (1962), in which he portrays "Walter Cunningham," a client of the main character, lawyer Atticus Finch. He acts as the leader of a mob that attempts to lynch another of Finch's clients.

He had a number of roles in Broadway plays and won an Outer Critics Circle Award for Best Performances in Supporting Roles for 1954-1955 for his work in Bus Stop (1955).

Early years 
Named Arthur Crahan Denton, he was the son of Arthur P. Denton (born in New York) and his wife May (née Graham) (born in Montana). The son Denton was born in Seattle, Washington, United States. He and his parents later moved to Piedmont, California, surrounded by the city of Oakland.

After graduating from local schools, Denton studied drama at the University of California, Berkeley. He moved to New York City, where he studied at the Neighborhood Playhouse School of the Theatre. In his acting career, Denton used his middle name "Crahan", an Irish surname in his family, as his first name.

Career 
Denton was active in Little Theater productions during his time as a student at the University of California, Berkeley.

In New York, he gradually gained stage roles, with Broadway credits including Key Largo (1940), Liberty Jones (1941), Fragile Fox (1954), Bus Stop (1955), Orpheus Descending (1957), and Winesburg, Ohio (1958).

From 1945 until his death in 1966, Denton also starred in many films, including The Great St. Louis Bank Robbery (1959) with Steve McQueen in his first leading film role, The Parent Trap (1961) with Maureen O'Hara and Brian Keith, Birdman of Alcatraz (1962) with Burt Lancaster, To Kill a Mockingbird (1962) with Gregory Peck, and Bus Riley's Back in Town with Ann-Margret and Michael Parks.

During May 1952 he starred as Abraham Lincoln in an episode of American Inventory that was a preview of a pilot for a proposed series.

He also performed as a guest star in many television series, including Bonanza (1961 episode "The Secret"), Alfred Hitchcock Presents, Gunsmoke (as “Clint”, a homicidal cold blooded outlaw in the S7E11 episode “Apprentice Doc” & as “”Walker”, a murderer whose guilt eats away at him in the S8E24 episode “Blind Man’s Bluff”), Have Gun Will Travel with Richard Boone, The Fugitive with David Janssen, and The Donna Reed Show (1962 episode "Once Upon a Timepiece").

In 1960, he co-starred in an unsold pilot titled, Mountain Man, about a Rocky Mountain fur trading station in the 1840s. Denton made two guest appearances on the CBS courtroom drama series Perry Mason with Raymond Burr. He played murder victim Frank Jarrett in the 1960 episode, "The Case of the Nimble Nephew", and the role of Templeton Cortland in the 1961 episode, "The Case of the Missing Melody".

In 1963 Denton appeared as John Lewis on The Virginian in the episode "Run Away Home."

Personal life 
Denton married Eleanor Brown in 1955 in New York City.

Death 
In 1966, Denton died after suffering a heart attack in Piedmont, California. He was 52 years old.

Recognition and honors
Denton won an Outer Critics Circle Award for Best Performances in Supporting Roles for 1954-1955 for his work in Bus Stop (1955).

Filmography

References

External links

1914 births
1966 deaths
Male actors from Washington (state)
American male film actors
20th-century American male actors